Kolah Jub-e Karmi (also Romanized as Kolah Jūb-e Karmī) is a village in Howmeh Rural District, in the Central District of Gilan-e Gharb County, Kermanshah Province, Iran. At the 2006 census, its population was 65, in 14 families.

References 

Populated places in Gilan-e Gharb County